Alexander Bárta (9 April 1892 – January 1945) was a Slovak fencer. He competed for Czechoslovakia in the team sabre competition at the 1924 Summer Olympics.

Biography
Alexander Bárta was born in 1892 in Levoča, to a Jewish family. In the civilian profession he was an engineer. 

He started fencing after the establishment of Czechoslovakia under the leadership of fencing master Šándor Salamon, the founder of the first fencing school in Košice in 1900. 

Later, together with his coach, he moved to the KAC Košice club. In 1922, Bárta achieved 3rd place in  sabre at the Czechoslovak Fencing Championships in Prague, and a year later in the same competition a respectable 2nd place. 

At the 1924 Olympic Games in Paris, a team consisting of Jungmann, Dvořák, Bárta, Oppl, and Švorčík took 4th place in sabre fencing. In the 1920s he was the best fencer in Slovakia, and one of the best in all of Czechoslovakia. 

He was killed in 1945 in Hrabušice, just before the end of World War II. He did not manage the tense situation in hiding and voluntarily surrendered to the Wehrmacht, who executed him. Later, the surviving family transferred his remains to Levoča.

International competitions

National titles
Czechoslovak Fencing Championships:
1922 Prague:  (Sabre)
1923 Prague:  (Sabre)

References

External links
 
 

1892 births
1945 deaths
People from Levoča
Sportspeople from the Prešov Region
Slovak male sabre fencers
Czechoslovak male sabre fencers
Fencers
Olympic fencers of Czechoslovakia
Fencers at the 1924 Summer Olympics
Jewish male sabre fencers
Slovak Jews
Czechoslovak Jews who died in the Holocaust
Slovak people executed by Nazi Germany